Duan Pidi ( 312–321) was a Duan-Xianbei chieftain during the Jin dynasty (266–420) and Sixteen Kingdoms period. He was the brother of chieftain, Duan Jilujuan, and served as his general in Jin's war with the Han Zhao state. After Jilujuan made peace with Han in 313, Pidi led his branch of the tribe to continue fighting Han from Jicheng. Pidi became the most powerful Jin vassal in the north, but his decision to kill his ally, Liu Kun and a civil war with his cousin, Duan Mopei severely weakened him. In 319, he was forced to flee to another Jin vassal, Shao Xu. He was eventually captured by the Later Zhao in 321, and despite receiving favourable treatment from its ruler, Shi Le, he would later be executed in fear of that he would rebel.

Early life and career 
Duan Pidi was a member of the Xianbei Duan clan of Liaoxi. His father, Duan Wuwuchen was the head of the clan between 303 and 311. At the start of the 4th century, the Duan clan allied with the Youzhou warlord, Wang Jun and played an important role in Wang's campaign against the Prince of Chengdu, Sima Ying, during the War of the Eight Princes. The Duan tribe and Wang Jun continued their association after the war, combining their efforts to stop the new and growing state of Han Zhao. Some time around 310, Pidi's elder brother, Duan Jilujuan, succeeded Wuwuchen as chieftain following his death.

Duan Pidi participated during Jilujuan's attack on Xiangguo in 312, as part of Wang Jun's plan to divert the Han general, Shi Le, away from the rebelling city of Yuanxiang (苑鄕, in present-day Hebei and Beijing). The Duan forces fought Shi Le at Xiangguo but their star general, Pidi's cousin, Duan Mopei, was captured in battle. Despite being a prisoner, Mopei was treated with courtesy by Shi Le, which pleased Jilujuan. Because of this, the Duan tribe ceased their enmity with Shi Le and distanced themselves from Wang Jun.

Wang Jun was eventually captured and executed by Shi Le in 314. After Wang's defeat, Shi Le appointed a man named Liu Han (劉翰) to be acting Inspector of Youzhou based in Jicheng. However, Liu Han instead fled to Duan Pidi, who he offered control over Jicheng. Pidi accepted on his own accord before occupying the city and submitting himself to Sima Rui, the paramount leader of Jin in the south. For this, Sima Rui made Pidi Jin's new Inspector of Youzhou. Pidi also urged Shi Le's Administrator of Leling, Shao Xu, to submit to the Jin prince as well. Shao Xu did so, and Shi Le immediately responded by sending his army to besiege him. However, Pidi sent Duan Wenyang to reinforce Shao Xu, so Shi Le called off his attack.

As Inspector of Youzhou

Alliance with Liu Kun 
In 316, Shi Le sent his nephew Shi Hu to attack the Administrator of Wei Commandery, Liu Yan (劉演). Pidi sent Wenyang to rescue Liu Yan, and while the commandery fell, Liu Yan was safely retrieved. Later that year, the Inspector of Bingzhou, Liu Kun lost his province to Shi Le. Liu Kun was left with nowhere to go, so Pidi sent a letter to invite him over to his base. Liu Kun took what was left of his army to meet with Pidi and the two men quickly befriended each other. Forming a brotherly bond, Pidi and Liu Kun arranged their relatives to marry one another to further cement their friendship.

The next year, Pidi and Liu Kun swore an oath of alliance by smearing their lips with blood. Afterwards, they sent their respective envoys to deliver a joint petition urging Sima Rui to claim the imperial title. Liu Kun chose his nephew Wen Jiao to deliver the petition, while Pidi chose his Chief Clerk of the Left, Rong Shao (榮卲). After their envoys reached the southern capital, Pidi proclaimed Liu Kun as Grand Commander. He also later tried to get Jilujuan into joining forces with him in a campaign against Shi Le. However, Duan Mopei advised Jilujuan against agreeing with Pidi, so Jilujuan did not respond, and Pidi had to cancel the campaign.

Arrest and execution of Liu Kun 
Jilujuan died in early 318 and was succeeded by his uncle, Duan Shefuchen. Pidi left Jicheng to attend his funeral but without his knowledge, Duan Mopei manipulated Shefuchen into believing that Pidi was about to usurp his power. At Zuobeiping, Shefuchen attacked Pidi but was then betrayed by Mopei who assassinated him while his and Pidi's forces were fighting. Mopei then took command of the assault and routed Pidi. During this, Mopei capturing Liu Kun's son Liu Qun (劉群), who was escorting Pidi to the funeral.

Mopei treated Liu Qun well and considered supporting Liu Kun into becoming the new Inspector of Youzhou. He had Liu Qun write a letter to his father asking him to work as an agent within Pidi's camp, but his envoy was caught by Pidi's scouts along the way. Liu Kun knew nothing of the letter when Pidi confronted him with it. Pidi had no suspicion towards Liu Kun, and Liu Kun himself assured that he had no intentions to betray Pidi. Pidi let him off at first, but his younger brother, Duan Shujun (段叔軍), was able to get his brother to heavily reconsider his actions.

Pidi quickly had Liu Kun arrested. Liu Kun's son, Liu Zun (劉遵), upon hearing his father's arrest, mounted a defence in his camp but was defeated by Pidi. Two of Liu Kun's generals, Pilü Song (辟閭嵩) and Han Ju (韓據), also planned to retaliate, but Pidi had the conspirators executed after their plot leaked. On 22 June, through the consent of Sima Rui's commander, Wang Dun, Pidi claimed that he had received an imperial edict to arrest Liu Kun and subsequently executed him along with his four sons and nephews via strangulation.

Although Liu Kun had long helped Jin in attempting to restore its authority in the north, Sima Rui refused to punish Pidi and forbid anyone from mourning Liu Kun, as Rui and most of the court thought of Pidi as a powerful and valuable asset. Despite Sima Rui's leniency, Pidi had underestimated Liu Kun's popularity, and the breaking of his oath caused many of the Han Chinese and tribal people to lose their trust in Pidi.

Alliance with Shao Xu

Fleeing to Shao Xu 
Seeing that support for Pidi was declining, Duan Mopei took the opportunity to attack him. Pidi led his army away from battle and tried to flee to Shao Xu in Leling but was badly routed by Shi Le's general Shi Yue (石越; not to be confused with the Former Qin general of the same name, Shi Yue) at Mount Yan. Pidi retreated back to Jicheng while Mopei declared himself the new Inspector of Youzhou. Pidi remained in his city for a year, but by 319, his situation had worsened. Shi Le's general Kong Chang had taken all of Youzhou's commanderies while most of Pidi's soldiers abandoned him due to depleting rations. Pidi planned to escape through Shanggu but the Prince of Dai, Tuoba Yulü, was waiting to attack him there. Desperate, Pidi abandoned his wife and children and made another attempt to flee to Shao Xu, this time successfully doing so.

Defense of Yanci 
In 320, Pidi's army was once again harassed by Mopei. Pidi pleaded to Shao Xu to assist him in getting revenge on Mopei, so the two men headed out and routed Mopei. Pidi followed up his victory by attacking Jicheng together with Duan Wenyang to reclaim his old base. This proved a fatal mistake as Shao Xu was left exposed to Shi Le. Shi Hu attacked Yanci (厭次, around present-day Dezhou, Shandong) and captured Shao Xu. News of Shao Xu's defeat reached Pidi, causing him to rush back to save the city. Duan Wenyang helped the army fight their way back into the city, where Pidi commanded the defence together with Shao Xu's family. In the middle of the year, Wenyang defeated Kong Chang, but it was not enough to completely repel the Zhao army.

Fighting continued into the next year in 321. Shi Hu attacked Pidi at Yanci again, while Kong Chang occupied the inner cities. Duan Wenyang volunteered himself to lead a daring charge with his cavalries to drive back the invaders. Wenyang valiantly fought and killed dozens of Shi Hu's soldiers. Supposedly, even after his horse had collapsed, Wenyang fought back with his spear, and when his spear snapped, he fought with his blade. This lasted for a day but Wenyang was eventually captured Shi Hu. His capture lowered the morale of the city's defenders.

Defeat and death 
Faced with imminent defeat, Pidi planned to flee alone to the south to serve Sima Rui. However, Shao Xu's brother, Shao Ji (邵樂) detained him and handed over Sima Rui's envoy, Wang Ying (王英) to Shi Hu. Shortly after, Shao Ji and his sons bound themselves to coffins and went out to surrender. When Pidi met with Shi Hu, he said to him, "I have received the favor of Jin, and my ambition was to destroy you. It is unfortunate that things have come to this, but I cannot respect you." Shi Le and Shi Hu had always respected Pidi, so much so that after his capture, Shi Hu lifted him up in the air and had him saluted as a gesture of companionship. Pidi was made Champion General, while Wenyang was made General of the Household Gentlemen of the Left.

Despite Shi Le's favour, Pidi remained loyal to Jin. Pidi often dressed himself in clothing used in the Jin court and held the imperial staff of authority that Sima Rui gave him. Shi Le was worried that Pidi's attitude foreboded a future revolt. After some time, Shi Le had Pidi put to death along with Wenyang and Shao Xu.

References 

 Fang, Xuanling (ed.) (648). Book of Jin (Jin Shu).
 Sima, Guang  (1084). Zizhi Tongjian

Jin dynasty (266–420) generals
Executed Sixteen Kingdoms people
Duan tribe